Bainbridge Township may refer to the following places in the US:

 Bainbridge Township, Schuyler County, Illinois
 Bainbridge Township, Dubois County, Indiana
 Bainbridge Township, Berrien County, Michigan
 Bainbridge Township, Geauga County, Ohio

Township name disambiguation pages